The National Agenda Party (KENDA) is a political party in Kenya.

History 
The party contested the 2022 Kenyan general election as part of Azimio La Umoja, and elected one MP.

References 

Political parties in Kenya